Chikhalthan is a village in the Kannad taluka of Aurangabad district in Maharashtra State, India.

Demographics
Covering  and comprising 1059 households at the time of the 2011 census of India, Chikhalthan had a population of 5041. There were 2628 males and 2413 females, with 672 people being aged six or younger.

Economy
It is a part of Sugarcane belt comprising Pune, Ahmednagar and Solapur belt.

The backwater of Ujani Dam situated on Bhima River is the main source of irrigation. Other than sugarcane nowadays plantation crops like banana, pomegranate can also be seen here.

See also

List of villages in Rahuri taluka
Baji Rao I

References

External links

Villages in Karmala taluka